National Parks of the Philippines are places of natural or historical value designated for protection and sustainable utilization by the Department of Environment and Natural Resources under the National Integrated Protected Areas System Act (1992).

In 2012, there were 240 protected areas in the Philippines, of which 35 have been classified as National Parks. By June 22, 2018, an additional 94 critical areas were designated as national parks, increasing the total national parks to 107, when President Rodrigo Duterte signed the E-NIPAS Act of 2018.

National parks 

 World Heritage Site or part of a World Heritage Site.

See also
 List of protected areas of the Philippines
 Environment of the Philippines

References

External links

 Expanded National Integrated Protected Area Systems Act of 2018 – Official Gazette of the Republic of the Philippines
 

 
Philippines
Philippines geography-related lists
Parks in the Philippines
Lists of tourist attractions in the Philippines